Michael Brent Cuddyer (born March 27, 1979) is an American former professional baseball outfielder who played 15 seasons in Major League Baseball (MLB) for the Minnesota Twins, Colorado Rockies, and New York Mets. He batted and threw right-handed. Cuddyer was a two-time MLB All-Star, and won a Silver Slugger Award in 2013, when he led the National League in batting average. Cuddyer announced his retirement after the 2015 season. He was inducted into the Minnesota Twins Hall of Fame on August 19, 2017. Primarily a right fielder, Cuddyer made starts at every defensive position except catcher and shortstop over the course of his career.

Early life
Cuddyer was born in Norfolk, Virginia, and is a 1997 graduate of Great Bridge High School in Chesapeake, Virginia, where he was a standout athlete in baseball, basketball, and football as well as student body president and National Honor Society member. In 1997, he was named to the All-America First Team by the American Baseball Coaches Association and Rawlings. Cuddyer was named Virginia's Player of the Year and Gatorade National baseball Player of the Year in 1997. He was also a member of USA Todays All-Star and the USA Junior National teams in 1997.

During his high school career, he played American Legion Baseball and was named the 2014 American Legion Graduate of the Year.

Cuddyer has given back to his hometown and high school many times during his career.

Professional career

Minnesota Twins
Cuddyer was drafted by the Minnesota Twins in the 1st round (9th pick) of the 1997 amateur draft, but did not sign until August. Cuddyer initially committed to play college baseball at Florida State but waited for the Twins' signing bonus offer to increase from $700,000 to $1.3 million before deciding to go professional. Consequently, he did not make his professional debut until 1998 when he was assigned to the Fort Wayne Wizards in the single-A Midwest League. Showing the tools that made him a first round draft pick and regularly named to the Baseball America's top minor league prospects, Cuddyer made steady progress through the Twins' minor league system and made his Major League Baseball debut on September 23, 2001, after hitting .301 with 30 home runs and 87 RBI in 141 games at AA New Britain. After hitting .309 with 20 home runs in 86 games at AAA Edmonton, Cuddyer would be called back up with the Twins for the 2002 stretch drive and would be named to the post-season roster where he would hit over .300 against the Oakland A's and the Anaheim Angels.
Despite playing over half of his 676 minor league games at third base and another 166 games at second, prior to the 2004 season Cuddyer got most of his playing time as an occasional fill-in in the outfield. During 2004, Cuddyer started to see more time in the majors in the infield, playing second and third base. After the departure of veteran Twins third baseman Corey Koskie to the Toronto Blue Jays by way of free agency in 2005, Cuddyer became the Twins' starting third baseman. However, he struggled at third base and was relegated to a reserve role for much of 2005, although he did hit .263 with 12 home runs for the second season in a row.

Cuddyer underwent surgery to repair a tear in his right lateral meniscus in October 2005. The Twins then extended his contract on January 21, 2006, giving him a one-year deal worth $1.3 million. After beginning the 2006 season on the bench, Cuddyer emerged as a regular in right field and in the cleanup spot of the Twins batting order. He finished second to Justin Morneau in RBI for the Twins in 2006.

Prior to the 2008 season, Cuddyer re-signed with the Twins with a three-year $24 million contract, with a $10.5 million club option for 2011.

On April 4, 2008, Cuddyer dislocated his right index finger after sliding headfirst into third base. He also suffered a laceration on the knuckle after getting stepped on by Kansas City Royals left fielder Alex Gordon. He was put on the 15-day disabled list and was activated on April 25 against the Texas Rangers. On his second game after being activated, Cuddyer hit a three-run home run off Rangers' Scott Feldman, his first of the 2008 season.

On May 22, 2009, Cuddyer hit for the cycle in a game against the Milwaukee Brewers. Three months later, on August 23, 2009, Cuddyer hit two home runs in the same inning, the seventh inning of the Twins' game against the Kansas City Royals, becoming the 53rd player in Major League Baseball to accomplish this feat. He is the only player in major league history to have performed both offensive rarities in the same baseball season. During September and October 2009, Cuddyer moved back into the infield playing first base filling in for Justin Morneau. Cuddyer returned to the outfield at the start of the 2010 season, but also found playing time at first and third base.

On July 3, 2011, Cuddyer was named an All-Star for the first time as a managers' pick. On July 25, Cuddyer became the first Twins position player to pitch in a game in 21 years when he was inserted in the eighth inning of a Twins loss against the Texas Rangers, in which they lost 20–6. The right-hander gave up a double to Mike Napoli, a bloop single to Mitch Moreland, and walked Ian Kinsler with one out to load the bases. Cuddyer then retired Elvis Andrus on a fly ball and David Murphy on a pop-up for a scoreless inning.
The last Twins position player to pitch was outfielder John Moses against the California Angels on July 31, 1990.

Colorado Rockies

On December 16, 2011, Cuddyer signed a three-year, $31.5 million deal with the Colorado Rockies. He chose to wear number 3 in order to honor Hall of Famer Harmon Killebrew, with whom he had grown close within the Twins organization before Killebrew's death.

In 2013, Cuddyer set a personal best with a 27-game hitting streak, the longest in Rockies history to that point. Cuddyer was also named an All-Star for the second time in his career. Cuddyer finished the 2013 regular season with a .331 batting average to win the batting title by 10 points over Atlanta's Chris Johnson. It was the 34-year-old outfielder's first batting title as the highest Cuddyer had hit in a season before 2013 was .285.
 
On August 17, 2014, Cuddyer again hit for the cycle, becoming the 30th player to hit for the cycle more than once and just the third player in history, after John Olerud and Bob Watson, to hit for the cycle in both the American and National Leagues. Cuddyer was the only player to hit for the cycle during the 2014 season.

New York Mets
Cuddyer signed a two-year contract with the New York Mets on November 10, 2014, worth $21 million. On July 24, 2015, Cuddyer was put on the 15 day disabled list due to a bone bruise in his left knee. With the Mets in 2015, Cuddyer appeared in the first World Series of his career, but the team would lose the series four games to one to the Kansas City Royals.

On December 11, 2015, Cuddyer announced his retirement via an article on The Players' Tribune titled "Play Hard and Dream Big".

Career statistics
In 1536 games over 15 seasons, Cuddyer posted a .277 batting average (1522-for-5488) with 809 runs, 333 doubles, 42 triples, 197 home runs, 794 RBI, 75 stolen bases, 527 bases on balls, .344 on-base percentage and .461 slugging percentage. He finished his career with a .986 fielding percentage playing at all three outfield positions and first, second and third base. In 28 postseason games, he hit .306 (26-for-85) with five runs, two home runs and eight RBI.

Personal life
Michael is the son of Henry Cuddyer and Marcia Harris. He has a younger sister named Katie. He married Claudia Rente, an English teacher, on November 11, 2006. Their son was born on June 20, 2008, and fraternal twin daughters were born on December 6, 2011. They reside in Chesapeake, Virginia.

Due to a childhood virus, Cuddyer has been deaf in his left ear since he was 11 years old. However, he insists that his partial deafness has never interfered with his ability to hear teammates on the field and he does not view himself as hearing impaired.

See also
 List of Major League Baseball players to hit for the cycle
 2021 Baseball Hall of Fame balloting

References

External links

1979 births
Living people
American disabled sportspeople
American expatriate baseball players in Canada
American League All-Stars
Baseball players from Norfolk, Virginia
Colorado Rockies players
Colorado Springs Sky Sox players
Deaf baseball players
Edmonton Trappers players
Fort Wayne Wizards players
Fort Myers Miracle players
Grand Junction Rockies players
Gulf Coast Twins players
Major League Baseball right fielders
Major League Baseball third basemen
Minnesota Twins players
National League All-Stars
National League batting champions
New Britain Rock Cats players
New York Mets players
Rochester Red Wings players
Silver Slugger Award winners
Sportspeople from Chesapeake, Virginia
Tulsa Drillers players